Trimethylarsine (abbreviated TMA or TMAs) is the chemical compound with the formula (CH3)3As, commonly abbreviated AsMe3 or TMAs. This organic derivative of arsine has been used as a source of arsenic in microelectronics industry, a building block to other organoarsenic compounds, and serves as a ligand in coordination chemistry. It has distinct "garlic"-like smell. Trimethylarsine had been discovered as early as 1854.

Structure and preparation
AsMe3 is a pyramidal molecule. The As-C distances average 1.519 Å, and the C-As-C angles are 91.83°

Trimethylarsine can be prepared by treatment of arsenic oxide with trimethylaluminium:
As2O3 + 1.5 [AlMe3]2 → 2 AsMe3 + 3/n (MeAl-O)n

Occurrence and reactions
Trimethylarsine is the volatile byproduct of microbial action on inorganic forms of arsenic which are naturally occurring in rocks and soils at the parts-per-million level. Trimethylarsine has been reported only at trace levels (parts per billion) in landfill gas from Germany, Canada, and the U.S.A., and is the major arsenic-containing compound in the gas.

Trimethylarsine is pyrophoric due to the exothermic nature of the following reaction, which initiates combustion:
AsMe3 + 1/2 O2 → OAsMe3 (TMAO)

History
Poisoning events due to a gas produced by certain microbes was assumed to be associated with the arsenic in paint. In 1893 the Italian physician Bartolomeo Gosio published his results on "Gosio gas" that was subsequently shown to contain trimethylarsine. Under wet conditions, the mold Microascus brevicaulis produces significant amounts of methyl arsines via methylation of arsenic-containing inorganic pigments, especially Paris green and Scheele's Green, which were once used in indoor wallpapers. Newer studies show that trimethylarsine has a low toxicity and could therefore not account for the death and the severe health problems observed in the 19th century.

Safety
Trimethylarsine is potentially hazardous, although its toxicity is often overstated.

References

External links
Index by Molecular Formula
Information on Hazardous Chemicals by Class
Microbial Methylation of Metalloids: Arsenic, Antimony, and Bismuth
Arsenic Curiosa and Humanity

Organoarsenic compounds
Foul-smelling chemicals